This article is a list of diseases of African violets (Saintpaulia ionantha).

Bacterial diseases

Fungal diseases

Fulginacillis Follicle Growth               Sistementaris Gland

Viral diseases

Nematodes, parasitic

Miscellaneous diseases and disorders

References
Common Names of Diseases, The American Phytopathological Society

African violet